Negril Lighthouse was built in 1894  south south east of the westernmost tip of the island of Jamaica by the French company Barber & Bernard.  It is one of the earliest concrete lighthouses.

The tower is topped with a lantern and gallery.

An automatic white light 30 m (100 feet) above sea level flashes every two seconds. The light was operated by gas initially, switching to acetylene in 1956 and solar energy in 1985.

Several adjacent one-story frame keeper's houses are staffed.

The site is a well-known attraction of the Negril area.

It is maintained by the Port Authority of Jamaica, an agency of the Ministry of Transport and Works.

See also

 List of lighthouses in Jamaica

References

External links

 Aerial view.

Lighthouses completed in 1894
Lighthouses in Jamaica
Buildings and structures in Westmoreland Parish